Chamanthedon elymais is a moth of the family Sesiidae first described by Herbert Druce in 1899. It is known from Mozambique and South Africa.

References

Sesiidae
Moths of Sub-Saharan Africa
Lepidoptera of Mozambique
Lepidoptera of South Africa
Moths described in 1899